Escape from Planet Earth is a 2013 computer animated comedy-adventure science fiction film produced by Rainmaker Entertainment and distributed by The Weinstein Company in the United States and Entertainment One in Canada, directed by Cal Brunker (in his feature-length directorial debut), with a screenplay which he co-wrote with Bob Barlen, and features an ensemble voice cast that includes Rob Corddry, Brendan Fraser, Sarah Jessica Parker, William Shatner, Jessica Alba, Jane Lynch, Craig Robinson, George Lopez, Sofía Vergara, Steve Zahn, Chris Parnell, Jonathan Morgan Heit, and Ricky Gervais. The film was released on February 15, 2013. Escape from Planet Earth received generally negative reviews from critics and grossed over $74 million on a budget of $40 million.

Plot
On Planet Baab, reckless astronaut and glory hog Scorch Supernova works at the organization BASA with his nerdy older brother Gary, who assists him on missions from BASA Headquarters. One day, Gary receives a message from the head of BASA, Lena, that Scorch will be sent to the "Dark Planet" (the Baabians' name for Earth) due to an SOS call. Gary opposes the idea, but Scorch accepts without his approval, leading to an argument between them causing Gary to quit his job out of frustration. Gary goes home to his wife Kira and adventure-hungry son Kip, only to find out that Scorch has already gone to the Dark Planet, via live TV.

Scorch arrives on Earth and finds a 7-Eleven convenience store, where he is ambushed by the US Army, led by General William T. Shanker, and is taken to Area 51. Witnessing this, Kip wants to go rescue Scorch, but Gary discourages him, upsetting Kip. That night, Gary goes to Kip's room to apologize only to find that Kip has escaped. He rushes to BASA with Kira and arrives in time to cancel a launch sequence at the last second and save Kip. Gary, having a change of heart, re-activates the sequence so he himself can rescue Scorch. Gary then arrives at the same 7-Eleven that Scorch arrived at earlier and is shortly captured by Shanker's men, taking him to Area 51 as well.

Gary is taken to Shanker's office where he is quickly removed after he receives an incoming call from Lena, who is revealed to be Shanker's girlfriend, as she has sent him the most powerful energy source in the galaxy, known as "blubonium", via Scorch’s robotic suit, not knowing Shanker only uses her to get the source. Gary is placed in a cell hall where he meets other aliens that were captured: a mouse-like alien named Doc, a cyclops-like alien named Io, and a slug-like alien named Thurman, who tell Gary that various human technology has been invented by them for Shanker to rip off and sell in exchange for their undetermined release from Area 51. Gary reunites with Scorch, but is again annoyed by his arrogance. Meanwhile, Lena captures Kira, who stayed at BASA and tried contacting Gary on his rescue mission, while revealing her plan to give Shanker a lifetime supply of blubonium.

The aliens are directed to the base's "peace shield", with Shanker revealing the blubonium, and Gary unintentionally provoking Scorch into stealing and breaking it. Shanker places Scorch into a freezing chamber and orders Gary to fix the blubonium for his brother's release, revealing that he plans to destroy all alien planets with life on them, stemming from an incident which a trio of grey aliens' spaceship (accidentally) killed his father back in 1947. Gary fixes the ray with help from his new friends, but Shanker goes back on his deal and freezes him as well. The other aliens discover Shanker's true intentions when he attempts to destroy Baab with the laser, but it is revealed that Gary rigged the machine to malfunction, destroying itself, and causing Gary, Scorch, and the other imprisoned Aliens to be released from their icy prisons. The brothers and their new friends escape Area 51 and head for Baab after locating Scorch's spaceship.

Meanwhile, back on Baab, Kip frees Kira, who subdues Lena after the latter takes off with a blubonium shipment. US Air Force jets chase the Scorch's ship, but Kip guides him through and manages to evade and destroy the jets. However, Shanker, wearing Scorch's robotic suit, uses a tractor beam to stop the ship in midair. Gary, followed by Scorch, jump out and manage to get the suit off Shanker which causes them all to plummet. While freefalling, Gary and Scorch reconcile before they and Shanker are rescued by the grey aliens, who previously helped Shanker due to their guilt of causing his father’s death but now turn against him after discovering his true agenda. After Gary knocks out Shanker, the grey aliens take him away. The brothers return to Baab and reunite with Gary's family. Scorch is greeted as a hero, but gives Gary the credit. To celebrate his return, Scorch marries his girlfriend, anchorwoman Gabby Babblebrook, with Gary as his best man.

Cast
 Rob Corddry as Gary Supernova, Scorch’s nerdy older brother, who is also the head of mission control at BASA.
 Brendan Fraser as Scorch Supernova, an arrogant but benevolent space pilot, Gary’s big and strong younger brother.
 Sarah Jessica Parker as Kira Supernova, Gary’s wife, who worked 15 years at the BASA Academy as a test pilot.
 William Shatner as General William T. Shanker, the villainous head of Area 51.
 Joshua Rush as Younger Shanker.
 Jessica Alba as Lena Thackleman, BASA's no-nonsense chief and Shanker’s love interest.
 Craig Robinson as Doc, a mouse-like alien.
 George Lopez as Thurman, a three-eyed slug-like alien.
 Ricky Gervais as James Bing, a sarcastic talking computer who is programmed at BASA.
 Jane Lynch as Io, a giant cyclops-like alien.
 Sofía Vergara as Gabby Babblebrook, an anchorwoman on Baab and Scorch’s girlfriend.
 Steve Zahn as Hawk, Hammer's friend, and owner of 7-Eleven.
 Chris Parnell as Hammer, Hawk's friend, and assistant.
 Jonathan Morgan Heit as Kip Supernova, Gary and Kira's son.

Development
The film was in development at The Weinstein Company at least since 2007. The film was first announced in a press release from The Weinstein Company, which announced that the film was in full production and also announced most of the cast.

The film was directed by Cal Brunker, who previously worked as a storyboard artist on the films Despicable Me, Horton Hears a Who! and Ice Age: Continental Drift. The film was originally set for release on February 14, 2013, but was pushed back to February 15, 2013, due to conflicting schedules.

Lawsuit
Writer-director Tony Leech and film producer Brian Inerfeld sued The Weinstein Company, claiming they signed a deal whereby they were to receive at least 20 percent of Escape'''s adjusted gross profit, which they estimated would be worth close to $50 million in back end participation alone. But the film languished in development, and the plaintiffs claimed that the Weinsteins repeatedly unlocked the script, forcing rewrites at least 17 times, which they say "eviscerated" the movie's budget by keeping 200-plus animators on payroll. With the film pushing its budget, the Weinsteins went outside for fresh capital.

The Weinstein Company entered into a Funding and Security Agreement with JTM whereby the financiers agreed to provide new money and, in return, get 25 percent of the film's gross receipts and 100 percent of all foreign gross receipts. Leech and Inerfeld were upset, alleging that the agreement had mortgaged their own financial upside and said the Weinsteins advised them that if they wanted their past due money, they would have to agree to this arrangement. Instead, Leech and Inerfeld went on the legal attack against TWC even claiming that they were paid $500,000 in hush money to keep the dispute quiet on the verge of the Weinsteins' The King's Speech Oscar victory in 2011. As for JTM, the plaintiffs demanded a declaratory judgment that their contractual rights to share in the profits were superior to JTM's security interest in profits from the film.

On February 15, 2013, the same day the film was released, in a document filed in the New York Supreme Court, lawyers for both sides filed a motion of discontinuance in the case, effectively ending it. No details of the settlement were made available but because the motion was filed "with prejudice" both sides would be paying their own legal costs.

MusicEscape from Planet Earth: Original Motion Picture Soundtrack, the soundtrack of the film was released on February 19, 2013.Escape from Planet Earth: Original Score By Aaron Zigman, the soundtrack of the film was scored by Aaron Zigman and performed by the Brussels Philharmonic Orchestra. It was released on February 8, 2013.

Release
Critical response
 

Stephen Farber of The Hollywood Reporter gave the film a positive review, saying, "The picture has enough entertainment value to tickle its target audience and even offers a few chuckles for accompanying adults. A strong cast and bright – if uninspired – animation help to offset a thin story. Decent box office returns seem likely." Tasha Robinson of The A.V. Club gave the film a C, calling it a "Mild-mannered CGI animated film that consists largely of broad conflicts, broadly resolved. It’s unchallenging fun for a younger crowd, but adults might feel like they’re staring down a colorful 24-piece board puzzle, trying to figure out how such a simple activity could be drawn out over 90 minutes." Mack Rawden of Cinema Blend gave the film one star out of five, saying, "Every single facet of the film is at best, slightly below average and at worst, downright terrible." Stephen Whitty of the Newark Star-Ledger gave the film two and a half stars out of four, saying, "It provides a few smiles, and a decent amount of rainy-day, kiddie entertainment." Neil Genzlinger of The New York Times gave the film two and a half stars out of five, saying, "A children’s movie about space-traveling blue beings that has lots of high-flying escapades but fairly low aspirations." Jordan Riefe of the Boston Phoenix gave the film two out of four stars, saying, "This might please young kids but torment discerning parents." Michael O'Sullivan of The Washington Post gave the film two out of four stars, saying, "Just like its hero and his grounded starship, Escape From Planet Earth is, for much of the film, a decidedly earthbound adventure." Vadim Rizov of Time Out gave the film two out of five stars, saying, "The late Douglas Adams summed up Earth as "mostly harmless," a description that also applies to this eminently tolerable animated time-filler."

Alonso Duralde of The Wrap gave the film a negative review, saying, "It's a bowl of warm water into which no one has bothered to place a bouillon cube. The kids in the theater with me never mustered a single laugh or gasp of excitement. It's plenty o' nuttin'." Peter Howell of the Toronto Star gave the film two and a half stars out of four, saying, "No matter whether you call Escape from Planet Earth sincere homage or cynical thievery, it goes down well in its brisk 89 minutes." Gregg Katzman of IGN gave the film a 4.5 out of 10, saying, "Escape From Planet Earth looks fantastic and is sporting some commendable voice acting, but these qualities can't overcome a stale script and significant lack of laughs. Unless you have a young kid that wants to see it, I just can't recommend this one at all." Sheri Linden of the Los Angeles Times gave the film three out of five stars, saying, "It never discovers new worlds, but "Escape From Planet Earth is, in its genial way, escape enough." Tom Russo of The Boston Globe gave the film two stars out of four, saying, "If "Escape" figures prominently into your February staycation plans, you won't feel like you've thrown your money away, but the kids won't still be buzzing about it when they get back to school, either." Roger Moore of The Seattle Times gave the film two out of four stars, saying, "The animation is what sells Escape from Planet Earth, with rich, textured surfaces – check out the fishnet webbing on Scorch’s spacesuit, the paint worn off the hardware and the perfectly rendered 7-Eleven, where even the Slurpee (product placement in a cartoon?) shimmers like the real thing. But it’s not worth paying 3D prices". Joe Leydon of Variety gave the film a positive review, saying, "A lightweight, warp-speed, brightly colored trifle that should delight small children and sporadically amuse their parents."

Box officeEscape from Planet Earth grossed $57,012,977 in North America, and $17,584,666 in other countries, for a worldwide total of $74,597,643. In North America, the film opened to number four in its first weekend with $15,891,055, behind A Good Day to Die Hard, Identity Thief and Safe Haven. In its second weekend, the film went up to number three grossing an additional $10,682,037. In its third weekend, the film dropped to number six grossing $6,619,827. In its fourth weekend, the film dropped to number nine grossing $3,218,923.

Home mediaEscape from Planet Earth'' was released on DVD, Blu-ray and Blu-ray 3D on June 4, 2013.

References

External links

 
 
 Production notes

2013 films
2013 3D films
The Weinstein Company animated films
Rainmaker Studios films
2010s American animated films
2013 computer-animated films
American children's animated comic science fiction films
American children's animated science fantasy films
American computer-animated films
Animated films about extraterrestrial life
Canadian children's animated films
Canadian computer-animated films
Canadian science fiction comedy films
Canadian 3D films
Canadian animated science fiction films
Canadian animated feature films
Canadian animated fantasy films
Films scored by Aaron Zigman
Films set in Canada
Films set on fictional planets
3D animated films
2010s English-language films
2010s Canadian films